The 1987 RAC Tourist Trophy was the seventh round of the inaugural World Touring Car Championship. The race was held for cars eligible for Group A touring car regulations. It was held on 6 September 1987 at the Silverstone Circuit, in Silverstone, United Kingdom.

The race was won by Enzo Calderari and Fabio Mancini, driving a BMW M3. The leading car eligible for championship points was another M3, driven by Emanuele Pirro, Roberto Ravaglia and Roland Ratzenberger, who finished in second place.

Class structure
Cars were divided into three classes based on engine capacity:
 Division 1: 1-1600cc
 Division 2: 1601-2500cc
 Division 3: Over 2500cc

Official results
Results were as follows:

 Drivers in italics practiced in the car but did not take part in the race.

See also
 1987 World Touring Car Championship

References

1987 World Touring Car Championship season
1987 in British motorsport
1987 RAC Tourist Trophy
September 1987 sports events in the United Kingdom